The Carso Center for the Study of Mexican History (in Spanish: Centro de Estudios de Historia de México Carso, CEHM-Carso) is a Mexican cultural institution devoted to the research, preservation and dissemination of Mexico's historical prints and documents from the 18th century to the 20th century. It is owned by the Carlos Slim Foundation (Fundación Carlos Slim), and is located in Chimalistac, in the south of Mexico City. It was founded in 1965 by Condumex.

The center is one of the founding members of the UNESCO's World Digital Library. Its archives contain 700 documentary resources – about 2 million pages – and its library has 80,554 books (18 of them are incunabula). The center has approximately 800,000 items.

History 
The center was founded by Conductores Mexicanos (Condumex). Its purpose was to rescue historically valuable resources –both bibliographical and documentary– in order to avoid their destruction because of the lack of preservation, and to prevent them to be sold to libraries and archives abroad.

This center was inaugurated in 1965 by Ricardo García Sáinz. The first acquisition of the center was a private collection of 10,000 books from the 19th century, which included resources from the Diocese of Guadalajara, and correspondence amongst several characters involved in the Independence of Mexico.

The first board of trustees was compounded by intellectuals like Jesús Reyes Heroles, Ignacio Bernal, Silvio Zavala, Antonio Martínez Baez, Alfonso Noriega, amongst others.

Some of the center's collection items have been handed to the Mexican government, such as the 1917 Mexican Constitution's promulgation letter, signed by Venustiano Carranza; or the diary of the Mexican politician and historian Carlos María de Bustamante.

In 1976, the center received its first interns from the National Autonomous University of Mexico: Josefina Moguel and María de Lourdes Martinez (nowadays, two prominent researchers).

See also
Carlos Slim Helú
History of Mexico
World Digital Library

Notes

External links
 Official Centro de Estudios de Historia de México Carso website

History of Mexico
Archives in Mexico
World Digital Library partners
Organizations based in Mexico City
Organizations established in 1965
Carlos Slim